Sonja Prétôt (born 7 June 1931) is a Swiss sprinter. She competed in the women's 100 metres at the 1952 Summer Olympics.

References

External links
 

1931 births
Possibly living people
Athletes (track and field) at the 1952 Summer Olympics
Swiss female sprinters
Olympic athletes of Switzerland
Place of birth missing (living people)
Olympic female sprinters